Alexander Semyonov may refer to:
Aleksandr Alekseyevich Semyonov (born 1983), Russian footballer with FC Dynamo Kostroma
Aleksandr Sergeyevich Semyonov (born 1982), Russian footballer with FC Neman Grodno
Alexander Semionov (1922–1984), Soviet painter

See also
Semyonov (disambiguation)